The Northern California coastal forests are a temperate coniferous forests ecoregion of coastal Northern California and southwestern Oregon.

Setting

The ecoregion rarely extends more than 65 km inland from the coast, narrower in the southernmost parts of the ecoregion.

The ecoregion is a sub-ecoregion of the Pacific temperate rain forests ecoregion, which extends up the Pacific Coast to Kodiak Island in Alaska. The ecoregion lies close to the Pacific Ocean, and is kept moist by Pacific Ocean storms during the winter months, and by coastal fogs in the summer months. These factors keep the ecoregion cooler in the summer and warmer in the winter, as compared to ecoregions further inland. The ecoregion is also defined by the distribution of the Coast Redwood (Sequoia sempervirens), with isolated groves located in protected canyons as far south as Redwood Gulch, in southern Monterey County. The greatest concentration of remaining Old-growth forest are in the northernmost portion of the ecoregion, primarily within Humboldt and Del Norte counties.

Major urban centers located within this ecoregion include the montane portions of various cities of the San Francisco Peninsula, Fort Bragg, Eureka, and Brookings.

Habitats
Redwood forests are interspersed with several other plant communities throughout this ecoregion.

Coastal redwood forests
The dominant forest type in this ecoregion is the coastal redwood forest. These forests are generally found in areas exposed to coastal fog. In the north, they occur on upland slopes, in riparian zones, and on riverine terraces. In the south, where annual precipitation is lower, they are constrained to coves and ravines. Coast Douglas-firs (Pseudotsuga menziesii var. menziesii) are nearly always associated with redwoods, but in the north the forests can also include Sitka spruce (Picea sitchensis) and western hemlock (Tsuga heterophylla). Like coast Douglas-fir, tanoak (Notholithocarpus densiflorus) is often present. Other hardwoods include California bay laurel (Umbellularia californica), red alder (Alnus rubra), madrone (Arbutus menziesii), and bigleaf maple (Acer macrophyllum). The deep shade cast by redwoods often results in a sparse understory, but shade-tolerant species include thimbleberry (Rubus parviflorus), redwood sorrel (Oxalis oregana), elk clover (Aralia californica), dwarf Oregon grape (Mahonia nervosa), salal (Gaultheria shallon), and many ferns, such as deer fern (Blechnum spicant), sword fern (Polystichum munitum), and leathery polypody (Polypodium scouleri).

Mixed evergreen forests
Mixed evergreen forests are found just inland of the redwood forests, on Franciscan Assemblage soils that receive moderate to high rainfall. The trees are a variety of needle-leaved and broad-leaved evergreen species. Characteristic trees include coast Douglas-fir (Pseudotsuga menziesii var. menziesii), canyon live oak (Quercus chrysolepis), tanoak (Notholithocarpus densiflorus), madrone (Arbutus menziesii), California bay laurel (Umbellularia californica), and golden chinquapin (Chrysolepis chrysophylla). The shrub understory is dense and diverse; beaked hazel (Corylus cornuta), evergreen huckleberry (Vaccinium ovatum), Pacific rhododendron (Rhododendron macrophyllum), salal (Gaultheria shallon), Sadler's oak (Quercus sadleriana), dwarf Oregon-grape (Mahonia nervosa), and poison oak (Toxicodendron diversilobum) are typically found.

Closed-cone conifer forests and woodlands
Closed-cone conifer forests are found in small, scattered patches throughout the ecoregion, typically adjacent to maritime chaparral. Common pines are lodgepole pine (Pinus contorta), bishop pine (Pinus muricata), Monterey pine (Pinus radiata), and knobcone pine (Pinus attenuata). These forests can also be home to several endemic cypresses, including Monterey cypress (Cupressus macrocarpa), Gowen cypress (Cupressus goveniana), and Santa Cruz cypress (Cupressus abramsiana). Shrub species include glossyleaf manzanita (Arctostaphylos nummularia), bog Labrador tea (Rhododendron groenlandicum), evergreen huckleberry (Vaccinium ovatum), salal (Gaultheria shallon), Pacific rhododendron (Rhododendron macrophyllum), and California bayberry (Myrica californica). Soil conditions sometimes cause these forests to take on a pygmy form. Lichens and mosses are diverse and can be abundant.

Maritime chaparral
Maritime chaparral is composed of a variety of shrubs that grow in the fog belt. Endemic species of manzanita (Arctostaphylos) and Ceanothus are locally common. Manzanita species include woolyleaf manzanita (Arctostaphylos tomentosa), glossyleaf manzanita (Arctostaphylos nummularia), Hooker's manzanita (Arctostaphylos hookeri), pajaro manzanita (Arctostaphylos pajaroensis), Montara manzanita (Arctostaphylos montaraensis), and others. Gasquet manzanita (Arctostaphylos hispidula) occurs in southern Oregon. Among Ceanothus, hairy ceanothus (Ceanothus oliganthus) is common, while Mason's ceanothus (Ceanothus masonii), Carmel ceanothus (Ceanothus griseus), and wart-stem ceanothus (Ceanothus verrucosus) are local endemics. Other widespread shrubs and trees include chamise (Adenostoma fasciculatum), California buckwheat (Eriogonum fasciculatum), black sage (Salvia mellifera), coffeeberry (Rhamnus californica), buckthorn (Rhamnus crocea), and coast live oak (Quercus agrifolia). This habitat is often found near closed-cone conifer forests and woodlands.

Coastal grassland
Northern coastal grasslands, or coastal prairies, are generally found below  on coastal terraces or mountain balds. In areas where fire has been suppressed, coastal scrub plants invade. Common grasses include bentgrass (Agrostis spp.), California brome (Bromus carinatus), Nootka reedgrass (Calamagrostis nutkaensis), California oatgrass (Danthonia californica), red fescue (Festuca rubra), Idaho fescue (Festuca idahoensis), tufted hair-grass (Deschampsia caespitosa), prairie Junegrass (Koeleria macrantha), tall trisetuem (Trisetum canescens). Common forbs include Douglas iris (Iris douglasiana), western blue-eyed grass (Sisyrinchium bellum), hairy gumplant (Grindelia hirsutula), and footsteps of spring (Sanicula arctopoides).

Coastal scrub
Northern coastal scrub consists of shrublands found at elevations below  on bluffs, terraces, dunes, and hills near the coast. This habitat is often subject to wind and maritime fog. The shrubs are mostly evergreen, small-leaved, and sclerophyllous. Characteristic species include coyote brush (Baccharis pilularis), yellow bush lupine (Lupinus arboreus), blueblossom (Ceanothus thyrsiflorus), seaside woolly sunflower (Eriophyllum stoechadifolium), sticky monkey-flower (Mimulus aurantiacus), poison oak (Toxicodendron diversilobum), California blackberry (Rubus ursinus), thimbleberry (Rubus parviflorus), salmonberry (Rubus spectabilis), coffeeberry (Rhamnus californica), oceanspray (Holodiscus discolor), salal (Gaultheria shallon), cow parsnip (Heracleum maximum), and western sword fern (Polystichum munitum). Coastal grassland succeeds to coastal scrub in the absence of fire, and coastal scrub succeeds to mixed evergreen forest under further absence of fire.

Riparian woodlands and shrublands
Riparian woodlands and shrublands are a mosaic of tree-dominated plant communities and open shrublands found along rivers. Species composition varies with elevation, slope, floodplain width, and flooding history. Nevertheless, common trees include white alder (Alnus rhombifolia), red alder (Alnus rubra), box elder (Acer negundo), Fremont cottonwood (Populus fremontii), red willow (Salix laevigata), coast Douglas-fir (Pseudotsuga menziesii var. menziesii), California sycamore (Platanus racemosa), coast live oak (Quercus agrifolia), and bigleaf maple (Acer macrophyllum). Common shrubs include sandbar willow (Salix exigua) and arroyo willow (Salix lasiolepis).

Live oak woodlands and savannas
Live oak woodlands and savannas are dominated by coast live oak (Quercus agrifolia). Canopy cover varies from dense forest to open savannas. In forests, California blackberry (Rubus ursinus), creeping snowberry (Symphoricarpos mollis), toyon (Heteromeles arbutifolia), and poison oak (Toxicodendron diversilobum) are common in the understory.

Ponderosa pine forests
Some of the rarest forests that occurs in this coastal region are the Maritime Coast Range Ponderosa Pine forests, an example of which occurs in the Carbonera Creek watershed of Santa Cruz County, California. These forest are dominated by ponderosa pine (Pinus ponderosa).

Protected areas

Samuel H. Boardman State Scenic Corridor
Tolowa Dunes State Park
Patricks Point State Park
Redwood National and State Parks
Humboldt Redwoods State Park
Headwaters Forest Reserve
King Range
Sinkyone Wilderness State Park
South Fork Eel River Wilderness
Jackson Demonstration State Forest
Mendocino Headlands State Park
Jenner Headlands
Montgomery Woods State Reserve
Van Damme State Park
Manchester State Park
Salt Point State Park
Austin Creek State Recreation Area
Grove of Old Trees
Sonoma Coast State Beach
Golden Gate National Recreation Area
San Bruno Mountain State Park 
San Bruno Mountain Ecological Reserve
Montara State Beach
Rancho Corral de Tierra
Mills Creek Open Space Preserve
Miramontes Ridge Open Space Preserve
Pulgas Ridge Open Space Preserve
Edgewood County Park
Teague Hill Open Space Preserve
Wunderlich County Park
El Corte de Madera Creek Open Space Preserve
Tunitas Creek Open Space Preserve
La Honda Creek Open Space Preserve
Windy Hill Open Space Preserve
La Honda Creek Open Space Preserve
Palo Alto Foothills Park
Los Trancos Open Space Preserve
Monte Bello Open Space Preserve
Skyline Ridge Open Space Preserve
Stevens Creek County Park
Saratoga Gap Open Space Preserve
Long Ridge Open Space Preserve
Sanborn Skyline County Park
Castle Rock State Park
Sam McDonald County Park
Pescadero Creek County Park
Pescadero State Beach
Butano State Park
Burleigh H. Murray Ranch
Purisima Creek Redwoods Open Space Preserve
Armstrong Redwoods State Reserve
Big Basin Redwoods State Park
Ano Nuevo State Reserve
Henry Cowell Redwoods State Park
Wilder Ranch State Park
The Forest of Nisene Marks State Park
Bear Creek Redwoods Open Space Preserve
Portola Redwoods State Park

See also
List of ecoregions in the United States (WWF)
 Cedar hemlock douglas-fir forest

References

External links

Sempervirens Fund
Northern California Coastal Forests images at bioimages.vanderbilt.edu (slow modem version)
Conifers of Northwest California

Temperate coniferous forests of the United States
Forests of California
Pacific temperate rainforests
Plant communities of California
Nearctic ecoregions
Redwood National and State Parks
Geography of Humboldt County, California
Ecoregions of California
Plants by habitat